A democratic republic is a form of government operating on principles adopted from a republic and a democracy. As a cross between two similar systems, democratic republics may function on principles shared by both republics and democracies.

While not all democracies are republics (constitutional monarchies, for instance, are not) and not all republics are democracies, common definitions of the terms democracy and republic often feature overlapping concerns, suggesting that many democracies function as republics, and many republics operate on democratic principles, as shown by these definitions from the Oxford English Dictionary:
 Republic: "A state in which supreme power is held by the people and their elected representatives, and which has an elected or nominated president rather than a monarch."
 Democracy: "A system of government by the whole population or all the eligible members of a state, typically through elected representatives."
Eugene Volokh of the UCLA School of Law notes that the United States exemplifies the varied nature of a constitutional republica country where some decisions (often local) are made by direct democratic processes, while others (often federal) are made by democratically elected representatives. As with many large systems, US governance is incompletely described by any single term. It also employs the concept, for instance, of a constitutional republic in which a court system is involved in matters of jurisprudence.

As with other democracies, not all persons in a democratic republic are necessarily citizens, and not all citizens are necessarily entitled to vote. Suffrage is commonly restricted by criteria such as voting age and sometimes by felony or imprisonment status.

History 
Historically, some inconsistency around the term is frequent.

United States
Prior to the American Revolution in what is now the United States—and before the coming of age of the "crowned republics" of constitutional monarchies in the U.K. and other European countries—"democracy" and "republic" were "used more or less interchangeably", and the concepts associated with representative democracy (and hence with a democratic republic) are suggested by John Adams (writing in 1784):

Asia
The Republic of China (Taiwan) claims to be the oldest of Asia's democratic republics, though its recent history of democratic process is largely linked only to Taiwan.

Africa
Likewise, Africa's oldest democratic republic, Liberia (formed in 1822), has had its political stability rocked by periodic violence and coups.

Global use of the term 
Starting in the 20th century after World War II, many countries used the term "democratic republic" in their official names—most of which were  Marxist-Leninist, or socialist, one-party states—that did not allow political opposition, free press or other democratic norms and institutions.

These include states no longer in existence or who have changed their governmental systems and official names,  (almost all Marxist-Leninist): 
the German Democratic Republic (East Germany),  the Somali Democratic Republic, the Democratic Republic of Vietnam ( North Vietnam), the People's Democratic Republic of Yemen (South Yemen), the Democratic Republic of Afghanistan and the People's Democratic Republic of Ethiopia.

States which (as of 2022) use the term "Democratic Republic" in their official names also include many that do not hold free elections and have been rated as "undemocratic" or "unfree" by organizations that gave such ratings.

In addition there are a few countries which use the term "Democratic Republic" in the name and have a good record of holding free or relatively free general elections and were rated "flawed democracy" or "full democracy" in the Democracy Index, such as the Democratic Republic of Timor-Leste (East Timor), the Democratic Republic of São Tomé and Príncipe and the Democratic Socialist Republic of Sri Lanka.

See also 
 Democracy
 Republic
 Federal republic
 People's republic
 Liberal democracy
 Indices of freedom

References

Republic
Republic